The following is a list of articles about and largely involving George Washington.

Ancestry and childhood

 Augustine Washington and Mary Ball Washington – father and mother of George Washington
 Lawrence Washington (1718–1752) – George Washington's half-brother and mentor
 Lawrence Augustine Washington (1774–1824) – nephew of George Washington
 Lawrence Washington (1659–1698) – Grandfather
 Lawrence Washington (1602–1653) – Great grandfather
 George Reade (colonial governor) – Great-great grandfather
 Coat of arms of the Washington family
 Washington Old Hall – Ancestral residence in England
 George Washington's birthplace
 Ferry Farm – Boyhood home of Washington

Private life
 Martha Dandridge Custis – Washington's wife
 Religious views of George Washington
 James Abercrombie (Episcopal priest) – Pastor who criticized Washington
 Mississippi Land Company
 Mountain Road Lottery
 Mount Vernon
 George Washington's Gristmill
 Woodlawn (Alexandria, Virginia)
 The Papers of George Washington
 George Washington and slavery
 Potomac Company – Washington as president of the company

Military career
 Military career of George Washington

French and Indian War
 George Washington in the French and Indian War
 Virginia Regiment – Washington's first military commission
 Battle of Fort Necessity – Washington's first military battle experience
 Fort Necessity
 Braddock Expedition
 Forbes Expedition
 Battle of Jumonville Glen
 Battle of Fort Necessity
 Conotocaurius (Town Destroyer)

American Revolution
 American Revolution
 George Washington in the American Revolution
 American Revolutionary War
 Timeline of the American Revolution
 Continental Army
 Continental Navy
 List of Washington's Headquarters during the Revolutionary War
 Siege of Boston
 Evacuation Day (Massachusetts)
 New York and New Jersey campaign
 Battle of Long Island
 Battle of Harlem Heights – Washington's first battlefield success of the Revolutionary War.
 Knowlton's Rangers – An espionage detachment of the Continental Army established by George Washington.
 George Washington's crossing of the Delaware River
 Battle of Trenton
 Battle of the Assunpink Creek – Second Battle of Trenton
 Battle of Princeton
 Valley Forge
 Battle of Brandywine
 Philadelphia campaign
 Southern theater of the American Revolutionary War
 List of American Revolutionary War battles
 Culper Ring – Washington's spy ring
 Newburgh letter
 George Washington's tent
 Washington's Life Guard
 Society of the Cincinnati – Military fraternal organization, Washington its first president
 Conway Cabal – group of Washington's critics
 Siege of Yorktown – Final major battle of the Revolution
 Washington–Rochambeau Revolutionary Route – Route taken by Washington during his march to Yorktown.
 Evacuation Day (New York)
 Fraunces Tavern – served as Washington's headquarters at various times before, during and after the Revolution.
 George Washington's resignation as commander-in-chief – of the Continental Army, and return to civilian life
 Constitutional Convention (United States) – Presided over by Washington

Presidency
 George Washington's political evolution
 Presidency of George Washington
 1788–89 United States presidential election
 George Washington's reception at Trenton – during his journey to the first inauguration
 Electoral history of George Washington
 Robert R. Livingston – Administered Oath of office to Washington, first term
 Tobias Lear – personal secretary to General/President George Washington, serving him from 1784 until the former-President's death in 1799.
 Slave Trade Act of 1794 – Signed by Washington
 George Washington Inaugural Bible
 1792 United States presidential election
 William Cushing – Administered Oath of office to Washington, second term
 Quasi-War
 George Washington's Farewell Address
 Post-presidency of George Washington

Legacy
 Legacy of George Washington
 George Washington Masonic National Memorial
 Cultural depictions of George Washington
 List of memorials to George Washington
 Electoral history of George Washington
 Washington's Birthday
 Washington Monument
 Mount Rushmore
 Parson Weems – Author of the 'Cherry Tree' account
 The Apotheosis of Washington – 1865 fresco of Washington on the ceiling of the U.S. Capitol Building
 Attempted theft of George Washington's skull

See also
 Bibliography of George Washington
 Timeline of the American Revolution
 List of presidents of the United States
 List of American Revolutionary War battles
 British Army during the American War of Independence

George Washington
1732 births
1799 deaths
People from Mount Vernon, Virginia
People of Virginia in the American Revolution